Zsófia Kovács (born 7 February 1988 in Gyöngyös) is a Hungarian professional triathlete, winner of the Hungarian Cup 2010 (Triatlon Ranglista) and member of the National Team.

Since 2004 Zsófia Kovács has regularly taken part in ITU competitions. Each year, she has achieved top ten positions in various age groups, e.g. the silver medal at the European Championships of the year 2004 (Junior), and, from 2006 onwards, also in the elite class, placing sixth at the Premium European Cup in Eilat (2006), fourth at the European Cup in Balatonfüred (2008), and ninth again at the Premium European Cup in Eilat (2009).
In 2009 Kovács won the Hungarian Triathlon Cup called Triatlon Tour after she had placed fifth in 2008 when she was beaten by Zsófia Tóth.

Kovács is an elite member of the triathlon club, GYÖTRI.

Zsófia Kovács still lives in Mátrafüred. She went to the local high school Nagy János Gimnázium in Gyöngyös and was selected, several times, for the national sports promotion scheme Good Student Good Athlete.

She competed in the Women's event at the 2012 Summer Olympics and 2016 Summer Olympics.

ITU competitions 
In the seven years from 2004 to 2010, Kovács took part in 35 ITU competitions and achieved 14 top ten positions.
The following list is based upon the official ITU rankings and the Athlete's Profile Page. Unless indicated otherwise, the following events are triathlons (Olympic Distance) and belong to the Elite category.

DNF = did not finish · BG = the sponsor British Gas

References

External links

 Kovacs' ITU Profile Page
 

1988 births
Living people
People from Gyöngyös
Hungarian female triathletes
Olympic triathletes of Hungary
Triathletes at the 2012 Summer Olympics
Triathletes at the 2016 Summer Olympics
Triathletes at the 2020 Summer Olympics
Sportspeople from Heves County
20th-century Hungarian women
21st-century Hungarian women